Sant Nirmala (Marathi: संत निर्मळा) was a poet in 14th-century Maharashtra, India.  As the younger sister of Chokhamela, she was deemed equally holy with her brother and thus is also deemed a Hindu saint.  Nirmala was married to Banka, of the Untouchable Mahar caste.  Her writings consist largely of abhangs that describe the injustice and inequalities she suffered as a result of the caste system.

Nirmala regretted worldly married life and reveled in the god of Pandharpur. She never mentions her husband, Banka, in her poems.

References

Warkari
14th-century Indian women writers
14th-century Indian writers
Marathi-language poets
Indian women religious leaders
Dalit literature
Hindu female religious leaders
14th-century Indian scholars
14th-century Indian poets
Women writers from Maharashtra
Hindu poets
Dalit saints
Dalit women writers
Dalit writers
Scholars from Maharashtra
Women educators from Maharashtra
Educators from Maharashtra
Dalit Hindu saints